Silvester of Troina was a Basilian monk, who originally entered the monastery at Bari, Italy, but fled when he was to be appointed abbot. Silvester then lived the rest of his life as a hermit. This St Silvester is patron saint of the Sicilian town of Troina, where he is putatively buried in the church of San Silvestro.

References

Italian Roman Catholic saints
12th-century Christian saints
1185 deaths
Year of birth unknown
Basilian saints